Foster Grant, or FosterGrant, is an American brand of eyewear founded by Sam Foster in 1919. The Foster Grant brand is a subsidiary company of FGX International, a consumer goods wholesaler with headquarters in Smithfield, Rhode Island, which has been owned by Essilor since 2010.

History
In 1919 in Leominster, Massachusetts, Sam Foster left his employer, the pioneering plastics manufacturer Viscoloid, to form his own plastics company in a former industrial laundry.

In the 1850s, celluloid was invented as a substitute for substances such as ivory and tortoiseshell. One major use for the new substance was in the production of hair combs, and this was Foster's first major product.

Foster Grant's original production line was ladies' hair accessories; over the company's lifetime, they have also produced other plastic materials, including heart-lung pumps.

In 1931, Foster Grant purchased the first plastics injection molding machine to be imported from Europe, however the machine arrived in non-working condition. Grant and a team of experts worked for several years to make the machine functional and reliable.

Sunglasses
In the 1920s, Hollywood actresses (featured on celluloid film) started wearing shorter hairstyles. These became popular, causing a collapse in the market for combs, and threatening Foster Grant. However, the development of injection molding technology made it possible to produce mass market celluloid sunglasses. Sales rapidly increased with Hollywood stars featuring in advertising campaigns, and the company became a major player in the sunglasses' industry.

Foster Grant's 1960s and 1970s sunglasses ad campaign "Who's that behind those Foster Grants?", included celebrities Peter Sellers, Louis Jourdan, Carroll Baker, Claudia Cardinale, Elke Sommer, Anita Ekberg, Vittorio Gassman, Anthony Quinn, Mia Farrow, Robert Goulet, Julie Christie, Woody Allen, O. J. Simpson, Raquel Welch, Terence Stamp, Clayton Moore, and Vanessa Redgrave.

That ad campaign was reintroduced around the year 2000 with model Cindy Crawford and race car driver Jeff Gordon.

Beginning in January 2009, Raquel Welch was the star of a national television advertising campaign for the Foster Grant Reading Glasses collection.  FGX International spent over $12 million on television advertising in 2009.  The ads were created by Ferrara & Co. of Princeton, New Jersey and produced by television director Bob Giraldi.

Foster Grant launched television commercials in 2010, once again with actress Raquel Welch. Today, the brand is represented by actress Kat Graham.

In 2018, FGX International, the parent company of Foster Grant, acquired Indiana-based One Click Ventures. One Click Ventures is parent company to eyewear brands Readers.com, Sunglass Warehouse, and felix+iris. In 2019, Foster Grant began selling on Sunglass Warehouse's website.

Foster Grant is a subsidiary of FGX International, which is in turn a subsidiary of EssilorLuxottica

References

External links
Foster Grant Collection—company publications, sales material, photographs, etc. from World War II era and later
Official website

Essilor
Eyewear brands of the United States
American companies established in 1919
Manufacturing companies established in 1919
1919 establishments in Massachusetts
Eyewear companies of the United States